Anthony B. Smith (born September 20, 1983) is a former American football safety who played for six seasons in the National Football League (NFL). After playing college football for Syracuse, he was drafted by the Pittsburgh Steelers in the third round of the 2006 NFL Draft. Smith has also been a member of the Jacksonville Jaguars, Green Bay Packers, and Tennessee Titans. He is a two-time Super Bowl Champion with the Steelers in 2008 and the Packers in 2010. Smith retired from professional football in 2012.

Early years
Smith attended Hubbard High School in Hubbard, Ohio. He started at safety and running back and wore the number three jersey, earning All-Midwest Region honors by PrepStar and All-Trumbull County Smith had six interceptions both his junior and senior seasons and rushed for 1,787 yards and 29 TDs for an 11-1 team as a senior, and rushed for 1,475 yards and 26 TDs to earn all-state accoladesas a junior. Smith also played basketball and baseball, and participated in track, competing in the hurdles, relay events, high jump and long jump.

College career
Smith played college football at Syracuse and finished his Syracuse career ranked third in school history with 14 interceptions. He also set a school record with six blocked kicks, turning two into touchdowns. Played in 46 career games, with 35 starts, recorded 293 tackles and posted 17 pass break-ups, three sacks, eight tackles for loss, four forced fumbles and five recoveries, and also returned one of his 14 interceptions for a score.

He had an immediate impact as a freshman, 71 tackles, with 1.5 of them coming for loss. He added a playmaking element as a sophomore, racking up 106 tackles and five picks on the year. Smith earned Second-team All-Big East as a junior after an 85 tackle, three interception season. He finished his career First-team All-Big East, posting 71 tackles, five for loss, three sacks, and a career-high six interceptions. He majored in retail and consumer studies. He was also recruited a running back out of the state of Ohio.

Professional career

Pre-draft
Smith ran a 6.63 3-cone drill at the 2006 NFL Combine, which was the 12th best time in that category. He ran a 40-yard time of 4.71 at the combine as well.

Pittsburgh Steelers
Smith started his professional career with the Pittsburgh Steelers. During his rookie year, Smith played all 16 games, starting the final four at free safety for injured Ryan Clark. Smith totaled 15 tackles (13 solo) with two interceptions and seven passes defensed and also had  15 tackles on special teams.

During his second year, he had a position battle with Clark for the starting free safety position, but the coaching staff stayed with Clark. However, Smith got his chance when the re-injured Clark went on injured reserve, promoting him to starting safety.

In 2007, Smith became infamous before a game against the undefeated Patriots, when he guaranteed a win. "We're going to win," Smith said. "Yeah, I can guarantee a win. As long as we come out and do what we got to do. Both sides of the ball are rolling, and if our special teams come through for us, we've got a good chance to win." The Steelers lost the game 34-13, with Smith allowing several big plays. After his poor performance, which included a few blown coverages, Smith was benched in favor of Tyrone Carter.

In 2007, he played in all 16 games, starting 10 mostly in place of the injured Clark, for a Steelers defense that was ranked No. 1 in the league. He also started one postseason contest. He finished sixth on the team with 74 tackles and had two interceptions among four passes defensed, and his first career forced fumble and fumble recovery. He also had five tackles on special teams

The following season, 2008, he played in 14 games as a reserve safety and special teamer, recording five tackles (two solo) plus four special teams tackles.

Green Bay Packers
After the Pittsburgh Steelers failed to tender Smith an offer as a restricted free agent in the 2009 offseason, Smith was signed by the Green Bay Packers on March 9. He was waived by the Packers on September 5, 2009.

St. Louis Rams
Smith was claimed off waivers by the St. Louis Rams on September 6, 2009. He was waived on November 5.

Jacksonville Jaguars
Smith was claimed off waivers by the Jacksonville Jaguars on November 6, 2009.

Green Bay Packers
Smith was traded to the Green Bay Packers October 17, 2010. He was placed on injured reserve on December 18. The Packers, however, went on to win Super Bowl XLV against his former team the Pittsburgh Steelers, making Smith a two-time Super Bowl Champion.

Tennessee Titans
On August 9, 2011, Smith signed with the Tennessee Titans. After playing in 13 games with zero starts and four tackles in 2011, Smith retired from the NFL in 2012.

Personal life
Smith has appeared in the music video "Tattoo" by Natasha Mosley. He has also formed the rap group FaceCard Bosses and is currently recording their debut album slated to be released in 2015.

References

External links
Green Bay Packers bio
Pittsburgh Steelers bio

1983 births
Living people
People from Hubbard, Ohio
Players of American football from Ohio
American football safeties
Syracuse Orange football players
Pittsburgh Steelers players
St. Louis Rams players
Jacksonville Jaguars players
Tennessee Titans players
Green Bay Packers players